Greatest Hits is the first compilation album by American country music artist Lee Greenwood. It was released on September 16, 1985 via MCA Records. The album includes the hit single "Dixie Road".

Track listing

Chart performance

References

1985 compilation albums
Lee Greenwood albums
MCA Records compilation albums
Albums produced by Jerry Crutchfield